is a Japanese-American particle physicist. Along with Ikaros Bigi, he was awarded the 2004 Sakurai Prize for his work on CP violation and B meson decays.

Academic life
Sanda studied at the University of Illinois (B.S. 1965) and Princeton University (Ph.D. 1969). He was a researcher at Columbia University from 1971 to 1974 and Fermi National Accelerator Laboratory. From 1974 to 1992 he was an Assistant Professor and then associate professor at Rockefeller University. From 1992 he was a professor of physics at Nagoya University. Since 2006 he is a Professor Emeritus at Nagoya University and a professor at Kanagawa University. Since 2007 he is also a Program Officer of the Kavli Institute for the Physics and Mathematics of the Universe, University of Tokyo. His major works are the proposal of a renormalizable gauge fixing method in broken gauge symmetric theory and the development of the theory of CP violations in B meson decays that has proven the Kobayashi-Maskawa Theory and has given a strong motivation for the experiments in Belle at KEK, Japan and BaBar at SLAC National Accelerator Laboratory, USA as well as fixing the necessary parameters of the accelerators to perform the experiments.

Religious life
As a devout Roman Catholic, Sanda is an ordained permanent deacon at St. Mary's Cathedral in Tokyo. He is also the author of the book "As a Scientist, Why Do I Believe in God", which describes his relationship between physics and Christianity.

Recognition
 Inoue Prize for Science (1993)
 Nishina Memorial Prize (1997)
 Chunichi Shimbun Prize (2002)
 Sakurai Prize (2004)
 Shuji Orito Prize (2015)
 Medal with Purple Ribbon (2002)

References

  I. I. Bigi and A. I. Sanda, CP Violation (Cambridge University Press, 1999), .

External links
 ArXiv papers
 Scientific articles of Anthony I. Sanda (SLAC database)
 Nagoya University Physics Department Homepage "History/Legacy"

Japanese physicists
1944 births
Living people
Princeton University alumni
University of Illinois alumni
Particle physicists
Columbia University staff
Rockefeller University faculty
Academic staff of Nagoya University
Academic staff of Kanagawa University
Theoretical physicists
J. J. Sakurai Prize for Theoretical Particle Physics recipients